Man in the Dark  is a novel by Paul Auster published in August 2008. Its topic is a dystopian scenario of the present-day United States being torn apart by a new secession and civil war after the presidential elections of 2000. (The fictional division between the secessionist and loyal states is very similar to the "Jesusland" map.) This is told within a frame narrative of an aging journalist reflecting on his family and the death of his wife.

Editions
Man in the Dark, Henry Holt and Co. 2008.

Reviews
California Literary Review, by Garan Holcombe 
San Francisco Chronicle, by Stephen Elliott 
The Telegraph, by Ruth Scurr 
The New York Review of Books, by Michael Dirda 
The Washington Post, by Jeff Turrentine  (Washington Post Best Books of the Year)

External links
Audio interview with Auster about Man in the Dark by George Miller on Faber website

2008 American novels
Novels by Paul Auster
Dystopian novels
Novels about journalists
Metafictional novels
Henry Holt and Company books